WSPM (89.1 FM) is a radio station licensed to serve the community of Cloverdale, Indiana. The station is owned by Inter Mirifica, Inc., and airs a Catholic radio format.

The station was assigned the WSPM call letters by the Federal Communications Commission on September 27, 2002.

References

External links
 Official Website
 

Radio stations established in 2003
2003 establishments in Indiana
SPM
Putnam County, Indiana